The 1980 African Cup of Nations Final was a football match that took place on 22 March 1980, at the National Stadium in Lagos, Nigeria, to determine the winner of the 1980 African Cup of Nations. Nigeria defeated Algeria 3–0 with two goals from Segun Odegbami and a goal from Muda Lawal, to win their first African Cup.

Road to the final

Match

Details

External links
Final match details - dzfoot
Final match details - 11v11
Qualifications details - rsssf

Final
1980
1980
1980
1979–80 in Nigerian football
1979–80 in Algerian football
March 1980 sports events in Africa
20th century in Lagos
International sports competitions in Lagos